The 2012 Tetra Pak Tennis Cup was a professional tennis tournament played on clay courts. It was the second edition of the tournament which was part of the 2012 ATP Challenger Tour. It took place in Campinas, Brazil between 17 and 23 September 2012.

Singles main draw entrants

Seeds

 1 Rankings are as of September 10, 2012.

Other entrants
The following players received wildcards into the singles main draw:
  Enrique Bogo
  Raúl Francisquiny
  Thiago Monteiro
  João Pedro Sorgi

The following players received entry as a special exempt into the singles main draw:
  Fabiano de Paula

The following players received entry from the qualifying draw:
  Andrea Collarini
  Tiago Lopes
  Andrés Molteni
  Ricardo Siggia

Champions

Singles

 Guido Pella def.  Leonardo Kirche, 6–4, 6–0

Doubles

 Marcelo Demoliner /  João Souza def.  Marcel Felder /  Máximo González, 6–1, 7–5

External links
Official Website

 
Tetra Pak Tennis Cup